Garry James Brooke (born 24 November 1960) is a former professional footballer who played for Tottenham Hotspur, Norwich City, FC Groningen, Wimbledon, Stoke City and Brentford before moving into non-league football.

Career
Brooke was born in Bethnal Green and began his career with Tottenham Hotspur. He spent a year on loan at Swedish side GAIS scoring eight goals in 23 appearances and made his Spurs debut in a 3–2 defeat against West Bromwich Albion. His full debut came in a 4–4 draw with Southampton with Brooke scoring twice. His debut season ended with a substitute appearance in the 1981 FA Cup Final which saw Tottenham beat Manchester City in a replay. His second season with Spurs saw the team again lift the FA Cup in a replay but Brooke's place in the side came under threat from Glenn Hoddle and Tony Galvin. He played 33 times in the 1982–83 season scoring nine goals but his run in the side was cut short due to a near fatal car crash in February 1983. It took him seven months to regain fitness and struggled to get back into the side due to his injuries causing him to be easily short of breath. He played in just seven matches in 1984–85 and was sold to Norwich City.

He never settled at Norwich as he missed London and also did not get on with first team coach Mel Machin. He helped Norwich win the Second Division title in 1985–86 but missed out on a medal as he played 13 matches, one short of the required 14. After failing to get into the Norwich side in 1986–87 he decided to move to Dutch team Groningen. Brooke enjoyed his time at Groningen as he was given a free role by the manager Henk van Brussel. He returned to England in August 1988 following the birth of his daughter and decided to sign for Wimbledon. He regretted moving to Wimbledon as he didn't fit in with their direct style of play and moved on loan to Stoke City in March 1990 for the remainder of the 1989–90 season. He played eight matches for Stoke which saw the team draw and lose four matches and ended the season being relegated. He later had short spells with Brentford and Reading, also playing in non-League for Baldock Town, Colchester United, Wivenhoe Town, St Albans City, Romford, Worthing, Cornard United and Braintree Town.

Honours
Tottenham Hotspur
 FA Cup: 1980–81, 1981–82
 UEFA Cup: 1983–84

Career statistics

A.  The "Other" column constitutes appearances and goals in the Football League Trophy, Full Members Cup, Screen Sport Super Cup, UEFA Cup, UEFA Cup Winners' Cup, FA Trophy, Conference League Cup, Isthmian League Cup, Herts Charity Cup and East Anglian Cup.

References

External links
 Career details at ex-canaries.co.uk
 
 i can't believe it's real buddha Retrieved 28 April 2009

1960 births
Living people
English footballers
Tottenham Hotspur F.C. players
Norwich City F.C. players
FC Groningen players
Wimbledon F.C. players
Stoke City F.C. players
Brentford F.C. players
Baldock Town F.C. players
Colchester United F.C. players
Reading F.C. players
Wivenhoe Town F.C. players
St Albans City F.C. players
Romford F.C. players
Worthing F.C. players
Cornard United F.C. players
Braintree Town F.C. players
UEFA Cup winning players
English Football League players
Footballers from Bethnal Green
Association football midfielders
FA Cup Final players